Bryce Taylor may refer to:

 Bryce Taylor (basketball) (born 1986), American basketball player
 Bryce Taylor (soccer) (born 1989), American soccer player
 Brice Taylor (born 1902), American football player and coach